John Douglas Robson (20 July 1942 – 23 April 2020) was an English footballer who made 33 appearances in the Football League playing as a centre half for Darlington in the 1960s. He also played non-League football for Gateshead and Horden Colliery Welfare.

References

1942 births
2020 deaths
People from Washington, Tyne and Wear
Footballers from Tyne and Wear
English footballers
Association football defenders
Darlington F.C. players
Gateshead A.F.C. players
Darlington Town F.C. players
English Football League players